Czesław Gendera (14 May 1918 – 18 November 1997) was a Polish footballer. He played in one match for the Poland national football team in 1938.

References

External links
 

1918 births
1997 deaths
Polish footballers
Poland international footballers
Place of birth missing
Association footballers not categorized by position